The sharp snouted day frog (Taudactylus acutirostris), or sharp-nosed torrent frog, is an extant species of frog in the family Myobatrachidae. It is endemic to upland rainforest streams in north-eastern Queensland in Australia.

Description
It was a diurnal, conspicuous and locally abundant species, but a rapid population decline began in 1988. It is considered endangered under Queensland's Nature Conservation Act 1992. The primary cause for its rapid decline is believed to be the disease chytridiomycosis.

References

Taudactylus
Amphibians of Queensland
Nature Conservation Act endangered biota
Taxonomy articles created by Polbot
Amphibians described in 1916
Frogs of Australia
Taxa named by Lars Gabriel Andersson